Mabel Greer's Toyshop are an English progressive rock (initially as psychedelic rock) band formed in London and initially active from 1966 to 1968.  The band was the precursor to the rock band Yes. Their music was marked by a combination of psychedelic, American blues and classically influenced arrangements with poetic lyrics. Members included Chris Squire, Peter Banks, Clive Bayley, Robert Hagger and later Jon Anderson. The band reformed in 2014 with original members, singer and guitarist Clive Bayley and drummer Robert Hagger, along with Hugo Barré, Tony Kaye, and Billy Sherwood.

History
Mabel Greer's Toyshop was formed in 1966 by composer-guitarist and vocalist Clive Bayley, drummer Robert Hagger and bassist Paul Rutledge. Other sources state that Chris Squire formed the band in January 1968. Hagger had previously met Squire, bassist of the Syn, after having auditioned for them earlier. The Syn broke up in 1967 and Squire was asked to join Mabel Greer. Peter Banks also from the Syn joined soon afterwards. Early in 1968 Jon Anderson joined the band after meeting Squire in a Soho nightclub.

Mabel Greer worked in the London clubs and Universities around London, including The Marquee, Electric Garden, UFO and Happening 44. During this time the band met influential BBC radio DJ John Peel at the Middle Earth club in London, and they recorded some tracks for Peel's radio shows, Top Gear and Night Ride. Some of the tracks were included on The Roots of Yes a compilation album released by Banks, such as "Beyond and Before", a later version of which appeared on the first Yes album, Yes (1969). Mabel Greer also did some demo recording session with the producer Mike Leander for MCA Records.

One of the last gigs for Mabel Greer's Toyshop before they changed their name to Yes was in May 1968 in Highgate, London. Described on the cover of the Yes box set The Word Is Live in 2005, the line-up was Squire, Jon Anderson, Banks, Bayley and Hagger. Bill Bruford replaced Hagger in June 1968, and Tony Kaye joined the band on keyboards, after which Mabel Greer's Toyshop renamed themselves Yes, as per Banks's suggestion. Bayley left Mabel Greer in late 1968.

The band reformed in 2014 with Bayley, Hagger, Barré, Kaye, and Yes producer and bass guitarist Billy Sherwood. The album New Way of Life was released in 2015 and includes new music as well some songs written back in 1967 and 1968 by Bayley and Squire.

The album The Secret was released on 8 December 2017. It featured a track called "The Secret" recorded in honour of Peter Banks, whose guitar work is featured.

Discography
Studio albums
New Way of Life (2015)
Images (2016) (re-master of recordings from 1967–1968)
The Secret (2017)

Personnel
Past and current members: Clive Bayley, Robert Hagger, Chris Squire, Peter Banks, Jon Anderson, Bill Bruford, Tony Kaye, Hugo Barré, Billy Sherwood and Max Hunt.

References

Further reading
Chris Welch, Close To The Edge, The Story of Yes, Omnibus Press, 2000 
David Watkinson, "Yes: Perpetual Change", Plexus Publishing Limited, 2001
Peter Banks, "Beyond And Before" Golden Treasures Publishing Arkansas, 2001
Will Romano, "Close To The Edge: How Yes's Masterpiece Defined Prog Rock" Backbeat Books, 2017

External links
Official website at MabelGreersToyShop.com
Mabel Greer's Toyshop YouTube Channel 
Music Channel for Mabel Greer's Toyshop

Yes (band)
English art rock groups
English progressive rock groups
English psychedelic rock music groups
Musical groups established in 1966
1966 establishments in England